"Mali Eningi"  is a song recorded by South African singer-songwriter and rapper  Big Zulu featuring Riky Rick and Intaba Yase Dubai. It was released as the lead single of his third studio album, Ichwane Lenyoka (2021), on November 20, 2020, by Inkabi Records.

"Mali Eningi" won Best Collaboration at the  2021 ceremony of South African Music Awards.

Accolades  
"Mali Eningi" at the 2021 South African Hip Hop Awards won Song Of the Year, Best Video, and Best Collaboration.

At the 2022 DStv  Mzansi Viewers Choice Awards, "Mali Eningi" was nominated for Favourite Song.

|-
|rowspan="4"|2021
|rowspan="5"|<div style="text-align: center;">"Mali Eningi"
| Song of the Year 
| 
|-
|rowspan="2"|Best Collaboration 
|
|- 
|
|-
|Best Video
|
|-
| 2022
| Favourite Song
|

Commercial performance 
"Mali Eningi" was commercially success  garnered  over 20 million  streams on Spotify and certified double platinum in South Africa with sales of 80 000 copies.

Certifications

Music video 
Music video was filmed  by Unclescrooch. As of January 2021, the song music  video  has ganarred 6 Million views on YouTube.

Track listing

Digital download and streaming
 "Mali Eningi"  – 5:00

Usage in media 
In December 2020, "Mali Eningi" started trending on social media after Duduzane Zuma posted himself on Instagram playing the song, soon after dance challenge  was started with the hashtag #DuduzaneChallenge garnering enormous success, and South African DJ's DJ Tira and DJ Fresh participating in the challenge.

Release history

References  

2020 singles
2020 songs